Caragh Hamilton (née Milligan; born 18 October 1996) is a Northern Irish footballer who plays as a midfielder and has appeared for the Northern Ireland women's national team.

Career
Hamilton has been capped for the Northern Ireland national team, appearing for the team during the 2019 FIFA Women's World Cup qualifying cycle. Hamilton, then Milligan, made her senior debut on 15 February 2012 against Belgium, becoming the youngest player to represent Northern Ireland at 15 years and 121 days old.

References

External links
 
 
 

1996 births
Living people
Women's association footballers from Northern Ireland
Northern Ireland women's international footballers
Women's association football midfielders
Glentoran W.F.C. players
Women's Premiership (Northern Ireland) players